Julian Taylor may refer to:
Julian Taylor (singer), Canadian singer-songwriter
Julian Taylor (surgeon) (1889–1961), British neurological surgeon and former vice-president of the Royal College of Surgeons
Jullian Taylor, American football defensive tackle